Mark Jay Mirsky (born 1939 in Boston, Massachusetts) is an American writer and professor of English at City College of New York.

Work
Mirsky's first three novels (Thou Worm Jacob, Proceedings of the Rabble, and Blue Hill Avenue) present a humorous and scathing portrait of the Jewish community of and around Blue Hill Avenue in Dorchester. He also published a pair of novellas under the name The Secret Table. The first story, "Dorchester, Home and Garden," deals with a man who returns to the burnt-out Jewish district on Blue Hill Avenue, and the second, "Onan's Child", is a retelling of the biblical story of Onan.

Mirsky's later, more experimental, works include The Red Adam, a novel written in the form of a "discovered" document unearthed in a Massachusetts library sometime in the 1940s. Mirsky also wrote several books of nonfiction including My Search for the Messiah: Studies and Wanderings in Israel and America and The Absent Shakespeare. His latest book, Dante, Eros, and Kabbalah, is a combination of literary criticism, Jewish mysticism and personal narrative.

Mirsky has also edited, and wrote the introduction for, Diaries: Robert Musil 1899-1942, and published several works and articles in The Partisan Review, New Directions Annual, The Boston Sunday Globe, and The New York Times Book Review. He is currently the editor of Fiction, a literary magazine at City College which he founded in 1972 with Donald Barthelme and Max Frisch.

One of Mirsky's plays, Mother Hubbard's Cupboard, was performed as part of the 2007 New York International Fringe Festival.

Bibliography
 Thou Worm Jacob (1967), Macmillan.
 Proceedings of the Rabble (1970), The Bobbs-Merrill Company.
 Blue Hill Avenue (1972), The Bobbs-Merrill Company.
 The Secret Table (1975), NY Fiction Collective.
 My Search for the Messiah: Studies and Wanderings in Israel and America (1977), Macmillan .
 The Red Adam (1990), Sun & Moon Press.
 The Absent Shakespeare (2002), Fairleigh Dickinson University Press.
 Dante, Eros and Kabbalah (2003), Syracuse University Press.
 Puddingstone: Franklin Park (2014), self-published on Amazon.
 A Mother's Steps: A Meditation on Silence (2016), self-published on Amazon.

References

External links
Fiction Literary Magazine
Mark Mirsky about 9/11
Interview about Dante, Eros and Kabbalah - at The Brooklyn Rail.
Review of Mother Hubbard's Cupboard - at NY Theatre.

Living people
20th-century American novelists
American male novelists
American academics of English literature
City College of New York faculty
1939 births
Jewish American novelists
American male short story writers
20th-century American short story writers
20th-century American male writers
Novelists from New York (state)
20th-century American non-fiction writers
American male non-fiction writers
21st-century American Jews